Sarah Streeter (January 31, 1953 – June 13, 2015), better known by her stage name Big Time Sarah, was an American blues singer.

Biography
She was born in Coldwater, Mississippi, and raised in Chicago, where she sang in gospel choirs in South Chicago churches. At age 14, she began singing blues at the Morgan's Lounge Club, and in the 1970s she played with musicians such as Magic Slim, Buddy Guy, The Aces, Junior Wells, Johnny Bernard, and Erwin Helfer.

Her experience playing with Sunnyland Slim led to her first solo release, a single released on his label, Airways Records. Teamed with Zora Young and Bonnie Lee in 'Blues with the Girls', Sarah toured Europe in 1982 and recorded an album in Paris, France. From 1989, she performed with a group called The BTS Express. From 1993 to 2015, she recorded for Delmark Records.

Death
Big Time Sarah died on June 13, 2015, aged 62, from heart complications in a Chicago-area nursing home.

Discography

Studio albums

Compilation albums

References

External links
BluesWebChicago - Big Time Sarah and the BTS Express
Sarah Streeter biography

1953 births
2015 deaths
American blues singers
American women singers
Singers from Chicago
People from Coldwater, Mississippi
21st-century American women